Flacey is the name of several communes in France:
 Flacey, Côte-d'Or, a commune in the Côte-d'Or department in eastern France
 Flacey, Eure-et-Loir, a commune in the Eure-et-Loir department in north-central France
 Flacey-en-Bresse, Saône-et-Loire